The 2013 Challengers League was the seventh season of amateur K3 League. The top three clubs of each group qualified for the championship playoffs after the home and away season of two groups (16 matches per team) and the interleague play (9 matches per team). The first and second-placed team in the overall table advanced to final and semi-final respectively, and the other four clubs advanced to the first round. Bucheon FC 1995 and Namyangju United withdrew from the league, but Gimpo Citizen and Hwaseong FC joined the league. Asan United (Yesan Citizen), which had moved its city to Yesan last year, returned to Asan.

Teams

Regular season

Group A

Group B

Overall table

Championship playoffs

Bracket

First round

Second round

Semi-final

Final

See also
2013 in South Korean football
2013 Korean FA Cup

References

External links

K3 League (2007–2019) seasons
2013 in South Korean football